Leontin Florian Grozavu (born 19 August 1967), commonly known as Leo Grozavu, is a Romanian football manager and former professional player who played as a defender. He is currently the manager of Liga II side Politehnica Iași.

Club career
Grozavu played professionally football with FC Baia Mare, Dinamo Bucharest, Ceahlăul Piatra-Neamţ, and abroad for 1. FC Saarbrücken in Germany between 2000 and 2002.

International career
He made two appearances for the Romania national team during 1994.

Coaching career
After retiring Grozavu became a coach, and was in charge at Armătura Zalău (2003–2005), U Cluj (2005–2006), FC Baia Mare (2007), FC Botoşani (2007–2008) and FC Vaslui (2009) as assistant manager for Viorel Moldovan. He also worked for Gheorghe Hagi's football academy together with Doru Carali.

Honours
Sepsi OSK
Cupa României runner-up: 2019–20

References

External links

1967 births
Living people
Romanian footballers
Association football defenders
Romanian expatriate footballers
CS Minaur Baia Mare (football) players
FC Dinamo București players
1. FC Saarbrücken players
CSM Ceahlăul Piatra Neamț players
Liga I players
2. Bundesliga players
Romania international footballers
Romanian football managers
Liga I managers
FC Universitatea Cluj managers
CS Minaur Baia Mare (football) managers
CS Luceafărul Oradea managers
FC Botoșani managers
CS Gaz Metan Mediaș managers
ACS Poli Timișoara managers
FC Petrolul Ploiești managers
Sepsi OSK Sfântu Gheorghe managers
FC Politehnica Iași (2010) managers
People from Suceava County